Sammy Lee Davis (born November 1, 1946) is an American soldier who served in the United States Army during the Vietnam War and was awarded the nation's highest military medal for valor, the Medal of Honor.

Early years
Born in Dayton, Ohio, on November 1, 1946, Davis was raised in French Camp, California. His family had a long tradition of military service; his grandfather served in the Spanish–American War, his father Robert Davis was in World War II, and his brothers Hubert ("Buddy") and Darrell Davis served in Korea and Vietnam, respectively. Davis attended Manteca High School in Manteca, California, where he was a member of the football and diving teams. He also participated in Sea Scouting in Stockton. After his junior year of high school, Davis' family moved to Indiana. He graduated from Mooresville High School in 1966.

Military career
Davis enlisted in the United States Army from Indianapolis, Indiana, in 1965.

In March 1967, Davis was sent to South Vietnam as a private first class, and was assigned to Battery C, 2nd Battalion, 4th Artillery Regiment, 9th Infantry Division.
On November 18, 1967, his unit at Firebase Cudgel west of Cai Lay, fell under machine gun fire and heavy mortar attack by an estimated three companies of Viet Cong from the 261st Viet Cong Main Force Battalion, which swarmed the area from the south and then west. Upon detecting an enemy position, Davis manned a machine gun to give his comrades covering fire so they could fire artillery in response. Davis was wounded, but ignored warnings to take cover, taking over the unit's burning howitzer and firing several shells himself. He also disregarded his inability to swim due to a broken back, and crossed a river there on an air mattress to help rescue three wounded American soldiers. He ultimately found his way to another howitzer site to continue fighting the NVA attack until they fled. The battle lasted two hours.

Davis was subsequently promoted to sergeant and received the Medal of Honor the following year from President Lyndon B. Johnson. After he was presented the medal at the White house ceremony, Davis played "Oh Shenandoah" on his harmonica in memory of the men he served with in Vietnam.

Davis retired in 1984 due to his war-time injuries.

Later years
In 1994, footage of his Medal of Honor award ceremony was used in the film Forrest Gump, with actor Tom Hanks' head superimposed over that of Davis.

Davis tells his story in the 2002 documentary A Time For Honor.

In July 2005, while in Indianapolis, Davis' medal was stolen out of the trunk of his car. It was recovered a few days later in neighboring White River.

On July 4, 2010, Davis helped celebrate the 100th birthday of the Boy Scouts of America at Arlington Park. Davis entered scouting at the age of 9. He has also been honored by the Joe Foss Institute for his dedication to serving America.

Davis is a member of the Church of Jesus Christ of Latter-day Saints.

Military awards

Davis's military decorations and awards include:

Medal of Honor

Citation:

Bibliography
 
 Davis, Sammy L. and Caroline Lambert (2016).  You Don't Lose 'Til You Quit Trying: Lessons on Adversity and Victory from a Vietnam Veteran and Medal of Honor Recipient.  New York, NY: Berkley Books.

See also

List of Medal of Honor recipients for the Vietnam War

References

External links

 Interview at the Pritzker Military Museum & Library

1946 births
Living people
United States Army Medal of Honor recipients
United States Army personnel of the Vietnam War
United States Army soldiers
Military personnel from Dayton, Ohio
Recipients of the Silver Star
Vietnam War recipients of the Medal of Honor
People from Indiana